Rebecca Beeson (born 20 February 1997) is an Australian rules footballer playing for the Greater Western Sydney Giants in the AFL Women's competition. Beeson was drafted by Greater Western Sydney with their fourth selection and thirty-second overall in the 2016 AFL Women's draft. She played every match in her debut season to finish with seven games.

Beeson received a nomination for the 2018 AFL Women's Rising Star award for her performance in round 1 of the 2018 season.

Statistics
Statistics are correct to the end of round 4, 2021.

|- style=background:#EAEAEA
| scope=row | 2017 ||  || 6
| 7 || 3 || 2 || 38 || 35 || 73 || 10 || 15 || 0.4 || 0.3 || 5.4 || 5.0 || 10.4 || 1.4 || 2.1 || 0
|-
| scope=row | 2018 ||  || 6
| 7 || 2 || 1 || 52 || 25 || 77 || 13 || 16 || 0.4 || 0.1 || 7.4 || 3.6 || 11.0 || 1.9 || 2.3 || 0
|- style=background:#EAEAEA
| scope=row | 2019 ||  || 6
| 7 || 0 || 3 || 60 || 54 || 114 || 14 || 22 || 0.0 || 0.4 || 8.6 || 7.7 || 16.3 || 2.0 || 3.1 || 5
|-
| scope=row | 2020 ||  || 6
| 7 || 0 || 1 || 57 || 55 || 112 || 14 || 19 || 0.0 || 0.1 || 8.1 || 7.9 || 16.0 || 2.0 || 2.7 || 1
|- style=background:#EAEAEA
| scope=row | 2021 ||  || 6
| 4 || 1 || 1 || 46 || 49 || 95 || 10 || 20 || 0.3 || 0.3 || 11.5 || 12.3 || 23.8 || 2.5 || 5.0 || 
|- class=sortbottom
! colspan=3 | Career
! 32 !! 6 !! 8 !! 253 !! 218 !! 471 !! 61 !! 192 !! 0.2 !! 0.3 !! 7.9 !! 6.8 !! 14.7 !! 1.9 !! 2.9 !! 6
|}

References

External links 

1997 births
Living people
Greater Western Sydney Giants (AFLW) players
Australian rules footballers from New South Wales